Nights Are So Long is the first studio album by singer Michael Monroe, released in 1987 through Yahoo! Records; a remastered edition was reissued in 2004 through Warner Music. It is Monroe's first post-Hanoi Rocks release, with Yahoo! being the record label of Hanoi Rocks' then-manager Seppo Vesterinen. Save for three tracks written by Monroe, the rest are mainly covers; his subsequent 1989 album, Not Fakin' It, would be the first to feature primarily original compositions. Monroe dedicated the album to Razzle, Hanoi Rocks' drummer, who was killed in a road accident in 1984.

Track listing

Personnel
Michael Monroe – vocals, saxophone, harmonica, arrangements, production
Phil "Wildman" Grande – lead, acoustic, rhythm and 12-string guitar
T.V. Lee – rhythm guitar
Klyph Black – slide guitar, bass, backing vocals
Ian Hunter – piano
Peter Clemente – drums, percussion, backing vocals
Yul Vaz - additional guitar on "She's No Angel" and "Too Rich To Be Good"
Tony Mercadante - fretless bass and backing vocals on "It's a Lie"
Rob Sabino - keyboards on "It's a Lie"

Technical
Eddie Solan – engineering
Greg Calbi – mastering
Craig Goetsch – production

References

Michael Monroe albums
1987 debut albums